King Puck is an Irish folk music album by Christy Moore. It was dedicated to Neans De Paor (1919-1992).

Track listing
All tracks composed by Christy Moore and Wally Page; except where indicated
 "Before The Deluge" (Jackson Browne)
 "The Two Conneeleys" 
 "Lawless" (M. Curry)
 "Yellow Furze Woman"
 "Giuseppe" (Moore, Jimmy Faulkner)
 "Sodom & Begorra" (Moore)
 "Johnny Connors"
 "King Puck"
 "Away Ye Broken Heart" (P. Stewart)
 "Me and the Rose" (Moore)

Personnel
Christy Moore – vocals, guitar, bodhrán
Jimmy Faulkner – guitar
Neil McColl – guitar, mandolin
Pat Crowley – accordion
Chris Corrigan – fiddle
Máire Breatnach – fiddle, viola
Roger Askew – Hammond organ, piano

References

Christy Moore albums
1993 albums